Harry Leonard Taylor (April 4, 1866 – July 12, 1955), was an American professional baseball player who played for the Louisville Colonels and the National League's Baltimore Orioles.

External links

1866 births
1955 deaths
Major League Baseball infielders
Baseball players from New York (state)
Cornell Big Red baseball players
Baltimore Orioles (NL) players
Louisville Colonels players
19th-century baseball players
Elmira (minor league baseball) players
Elmira Hottentots players
Ithaca High School (Ithaca, New York) alumni
People from Tioga County, New York
New York Supreme Court Justices
Cornell Law School alumni
Minor league baseball executives
Lawyers from Buffalo, New York
Sportspeople from Ithaca, New York
Cornell Big Red baseball coaches